Tony Miller is an English cinematographer and documentary filmmaker. He directed Mustang: The Hidden Kingdom, a Discovery Channel documentary narrated by Harrison Ford, following an emissary sent by the Dalai Lama to the then closed kingdom of Mustang.

Selected filmography

Cinematographer 
 Carnival Row (2019)
 Fleabag (2016)
 Zen (2011)
 The Turn of the Screw (2009)
 Small Island (2009)
 The Meerkats (2008)
 Survivors (2008) 
 In Love with Barbara (2008)
 The Passion (2008)
 I Really Hate My Job (2007)
 Infinite Justice (2006)
 The Honeytrap (2002)
 The Sandman (2000) 
Bramwell (1998)

Director 
 Mustang: The Hidden Kingdom (1994)

References

Living people
English cinematographers
Year of birth missing (living people)